Lutz Fleischer (born 1956 in Dresden - 10 July 2019) was a German painter and graphic artist. He won the Hans-Theo-Richter-Preis of the Sächsische Akademie der Künste in 2005.

See also
 List of German painters

References

20th-century German painters
20th-century German male artists
German male painters
21st-century German painters
21st-century German male artists
1956 births
2019 deaths
Artists from Dresden
German graphic designers